Picardia eparches is a moth of the family Pterophoridae. It is known from Kenya and Uganda.

The wingspan is 20–25 mm.

References

Oidaematophorini
Moths of Africa
Moths described in 1931
Taxa named by Edward Meyrick